The 2002 Singer Sri Lankan Airlines Rugby 7s was the fourth year of the Singer Sri Lankan Airlines Rugby 7s tournament.  Portugal defeated Kenya 24 - 21 in the final of the Cup.

First round

Pool A

 31 - 12 
 15 - 15 
 42 - 14 
 38 - 07 
 33 - 00 
 33 - 14 

{| class="wikitable" style="text-align: center;"
|-
!width="200"|Teams
!width="40"|Pld
!width="40"|W
!width="40"|D
!width="40"|L
!width="40"|PF
!width="40"|PA
!width="40"|+/−
!width="40"|Pts
|-style="background:#ccffcc"
|align=left| 
|3||2||1||0||90||29||+61||8
|-style="background:#ccffcc"
|align=left| 
|3||2||1||0||86||36||+50||7
|-style="background:#ffe6bd"
|align=left| 
|3||1||0||2||59||87||-28||5
|-style="background:#fcc6bd"
|align=left| 
|3||0||0||3||19||102||−83||3
|}

Pool B

 24 - 21 
 28 - 00  Arabian Gulf
 Arabian Gulf 24 - 14 
 29 - 00 
 Arabian Gulf 33 - 14 
 33 - 07 

{| class="wikitable" style="text-align: center;"
|-
!width="200"|Teams
!width="40"|Pld
!width="40"|W
!width="40"|D
!width="40"|L
!width="40"|PF
!width="40"|PA
!width="40"|+/−
!width="40"|Pts
|-style="background:#ccffcc"
|align=left| 
|3||3||0||0||90||7||+83||9
|-style="background:#ccffcc"
|align=left|  Arabian Gulf
|3||2||0||1||57||56||+1||7
|-style="background:#ffe6bd"
|align=left| 
|3||1||0||2||45||78||-33||5
|-style="background:#fcc6bd"
|align=left| 
|3||0||0||3||7||35||−51||3
|}

Pool C

 33 - 00 
 12 - 07 
 12 - 05  
 38 - 14 
 19 - 14 
 40 - 00 

{| class="wikitable" style="text-align: center;"
|-
!width="200"|Teams
!width="40"|Pld
!width="40"|W
!width="40"|D
!width="40"|L
!width="40"|PF
!width="40"|PA
!width="40"|+/−
!width="40"|Pts
|-style="background:#ccffcc"
|align=left| 
|3||3||0||0||111||14||+97||9
|-style="background:#ccffcc"
|align=left| 
|3||2||0||1||45||59||-14||7
|-style="background:#ffe6bd"
|align=left| 
|3||1||0||2||19||57||-38||5
|-style="background:#fcc6bd"
|align=left|  
|3||0||0||3||19||64||−45||3
|}

Pool D

 19 - 00 
 17 - 14 
 21 - 14 
 36 - 19 
 33 - 10  
 54 - 00 

{| class="wikitable" style="text-align: center;"
|-
!width="200"|Teams
!width="40"|Pld
!width="40"|W
!width="40"|D
!width="40"|L
!width="40"|PF
!width="40"|PA
!width="40"|+/−
!width="40"|Pts
|-style="background:#ccffcc"
|align=left| 
|3||3||0||0||86||43||+43||9
|-style="background:#ccffcc"
|align=left|  
|3||2||0||1||50||47||+3||7
|-style="background:#ffe6bd"
|align=left| 
|3||1||0||2||82||38||+44||5
|-style="background:#fcc6bd"
|align=left|  
|3||0||0||3||19||109||−90||3
|}

Second round

Bowl

Plate

Cup

References

2002
2002 rugby sevens competitions
2002 in Asian rugby union
rugby sevens